CFRN may refer to:
 CFRN (AM), a radio station (1260 AM) licensed to serve Edmonton, Alberta, Canada
 CFRN-DT, a television station (channel 3) licensed to serve Edmonton
 CFBR-FM, a radio station (100.3 FM) licensed to serve Edmonton, which held the call sign CFRN-FM from 1951 to 1979
 Certified Flight Registered Nurse
 Coalition for Rainforest Nations